Psathyrotes is a genus of North American plants in the sneezeweed tribe within the sunflower family. It contains annual and perennial forbs and low subshrubs native to dry areas of southwestern North America.  Common names include turtleback, brittlestem, and fanleaf.

The plants are low, densely branching, hairy, and scaly, with a turpentine-like odor.  Leaves are alternate and hairy.  The Latin name of the genus (from the Greek psathurotes) refers to the brittleness of the stems.

Species
 Psathyrotes annua (Nutt.) Gray (annual psathyrotes, mealy rosettes, turtleback) - CA NV UT AZ ID
 Synonyms: Bulbostylis annua Nutt.
 Annual or perennial forb
 Psathyrotes pilifera Gray (hairy-beast turtleback, hairybeast brittlestem) - NV UT AZ
 Annual forb
 Psathyrotes ramosissima (Torr.) Gray (velvet rosette, velvet turtleback, turtleback) - NV UT AZ CA, Baja California, Sonora
 Synonyms: Tetradymia ramosissima Torr.
 Annual or perennial forb or subshrub

formerly included
see Peucephyllum Psathyrotopsis Trichoptilium 
 Psathyrotes incisa A.Gray - Trichoptilium incisum (A.Gray) A.Gray
 Psathyrotes purpusii Brandegee - Psathyrotopsis purpusii (Brandegee) Rydb.
 Psathyrotes scaposa A.Gray - Psathyrotopsis scaposa (A.Gray) H.Rob.
 Psathyrotes schottii (A.Gray) A.Gray - Peucephyllum schottii A.Gray

References

External links
 ITIS report
 Jepson Manual treatment
Psathyrotes ramosissima at Calflora

Asteraceae genera
Helenieae
Flora of North America